Chordifex fastigiatus, known as the tassel rush is an Australian species of plant. One of the many plants first published by Robert Brown with the type known as "(J.) v.v." Appearing in his Prodromus Florae Novae Hollandiae et Insulae Van Diemen in 1810.

References

Restionaceae
Flora of New South Wales
Flora of Queensland
Taxa named by Robert Brown (botanist, born 1773)